Audrey Patrice Marks has served two terms as Jamaica's Ambassador to the United States from 2008 to 2012 and again starting in 2016. She is Jamaica's first female Ambassador to the US and the first individual to hold the position twice in two separate terms. She simultaneously serves as Jamaica's permanent representative to the Organization of American States.

Background 
Prior to assuming her Ambassadorial role, Ambassador Marks, an entrepreneur by profession, started and operated six previous businesses, including a 100-acre banana exporting farm, a transportation company, as well as a real estate sales and development company. She also operated a Venture Capital Company with diverse investments, including manufacturing, travel, and entertainment.

She is perhaps best known for having founded Paymaster (Jamaica) Limited, an online bill payment system which she conceptualized and started in 1997. Paymaster operates payment agencies from which all types of bill payments and remittances can be made and is the first multi-transaction agency in the Caribbean.

Ambassador Marks has also served on several private and public sector Boards, including being the Chairman of the Central Wastewater Treatment Company Limited (CWTC); Chair of the Tourism Product Development Company (TPDCo); Deputy Chair of the Urban Development Corporation (UDC); Director of the Board of RBTT Securities Jamaica Limited; Jamaica Trade and Invest (JTI); National Health Fund (NHF); and the University of the West Indies (Mona School of Business). She has the distinction of being the first female President of the American Chamber of Commerce of Jamaica (AMCHAM), an organization which promotes investment and trade between the United States and Jamaica.

Early life and education 
She attended Marymount High School, Jamaica and finished high school at Immaculate Conception High School in Jamaica. She holds a Bachelor's and a Master's degree in Business Administration from the University of the West Indies, Mona, Jamaica, and Nova University, Florida in the U.S. respectively.

Awards and honours 
Ambassador Marks is the recipient of numerous citations and recognition from her peers and various organizations for her pioneering work, entrepreneurial endeavours and commitment to social causes. These include: Ernest & Young Nominee for the "Caribbean Entrepreneur of the Year 2000"; Business Leader of the Year Award nominee for 2000; and the Florida International University Business Leader of the Year Award for 2003 and 2010.

She was also awarded the distinguished Doctor of Laws, honoris causa from Northern Caribbean University (NCU).

References 

Ambassadors of Jamaica to the United States
Jamaican businesspeople
Jamaican women in business
People from Saint Mary Parish, Jamaica
Living people
1968 births
Jamaican women ambassadors
University of the West Indies alumni
Nova Southeastern University alumni